Rainer Nygård (born 1972) is a Finnish guitar player and singer for the band Diablo. He was born in Kalajoki but now resides in Tampere. He is a forming member of Diablo and is responsible for most of the song writing for the band with Marko Utriainen and does all the lyrics. Rainer uses custombuilt one-off guitars manufactured by Ruokangas Guitars in Finland.

References

1972 births
Living people
Finnish heavy metal guitarists
Finnish heavy metal musicians
Finnish heavy metal singers
People from Kalajoki
21st-century Finnish singers
21st-century guitarists